Atractotrematidae is a family of trematodes belonging to the order Plagiorchiida.

Genera:
 Atractotrema Goto & Ozaki, 1929
 Isorchis Durio & Manter, 1969
 Pseudisorchis Ahmad, 1985
 Pseudomegasolena Machida & Kamiya, 1976

References

Plagiorchiida